Klingen (Danish: Blade) was an art magazine based in Copenhagen, Denmark. The magazine existed between 1917 and 1920.

History and profile
Klingen was established in 1917, and the first issue appeared in October 1917. The founder was the painter and graphic artist Axel Salto. The magazine was based in Copenhagen. It was considered to be a significant vehicle for the entrance of modernism in Denmark. In addition, it was instrumental in expanding avant-garde art into Nordic countries. The magazine had significant effects on painters, writers and intellectuals in the region. The artists attached to the magazine had an optimistic view following World War I, and argued that  the beauty in art had social and political significance providing a means in understanding and responding to the chaotic situation of post-war Europe.

Major contributors of Klingen included Otto Gelsted, Emil Bønnelycke, Poul Henningsen and Sophus Danneskjold-Samsøe. Klingen ceased publication in November 1920 after producing a total of thirty-six issues. In 1942 an anniversary issue was published.

Several issues of Klingen were digitized by the Royal Library of Denmark in 1996. All issues, including the 1942 anniversary issue, of the magazine are also archived under the Blue Mountain Project of Princeton University.

See also
 List of avant-garde magazines
 List of magazines in Denmark

References

External links
 Digitized issues of Klingen under Blue Mountain Project at Princeton University

1917 establishments in Denmark
1920 disestablishments in Denmark
Avant-garde magazines
Danish-language magazines
Defunct magazines published in Denmark
Magazines established in 1917
Magazines disestablished in 1920
Magazines published in Copenhagen
Modernism
Visual arts magazines